"I'm Here" is Yuna Ito's seventh single in total, and first of the year 2007, released after her successful debut album "Heart", on March 14, 2007, under Studioseven Recordings.

Track list
"I'm Here"
"Reason Why"
"Faith" (Teardance remix)
"I'm Here" (instrumental)

Charts
The single overall did not reach a higher position at the Daily Single Rankings than #10. It eventually fell down and is pending between #13 and #15 since its release. A day after UNFAIR -the movie- was released, it was the only time for the single to be in the Top 10. First week sales have extended to 12,485 units sold, quite a disappointment considering her album "Heart" has sold well over 460,000 copies. The Weekly Single Rank is #15 right now.

2007 singles
Yuna Ito songs
2007 songs
Japanese film songs